The 2017 World Rowing U23 Championships was the 13th edition of the World Rowing U23 Championships and was held from 19 to 23 July 2017 at the Complex Greben Kanal in Plovdiv, Bulgaria.

Medal summary

Men's events

Women's events

Medal table

See also 
 2017 World Rowing Championships
 World Rowing Junior Championships 2017

References

External links 
 Official website
 WorldRowing website

World Rowing U23 Championships
Rowing competitions in Bulgaria
2017 in Bulgarian sport
International sports competitions hosted by Bulgaria
Sport in Plovdiv
2017 in rowing
July 2017 sports events in Europe